The United Nations Department of Political and Peacebuilding Affairs (DPPA) is a department of the Secretariat of the United Nations (UN) with responsibility for monitoring and assessing global political developments and advising and assisting the UN Secretary General and his envoys in the peaceful prevention and resolution of conflict around the world. The department manages field-based political missions in Africa, Central Asia, and the Middle East, and has been increasing its professional capacities in conflict mediation and preventive diplomacy. DPPA also oversees UN electoral assistance to Member States of the organization. Established in 1992, the department's responsibilities also include providing secretariat support to the UN Security Council and two standing committees created by the General Assembly concerning the Rights of the Palestinian People and Decolonization. DPPA is based at the UN Headquarters in New York City.

Staffing
 Rosemary DiCarlo – Under-Secretary-General for Political and Peacebuilding Affairs
 Oscar Fernandez-Taranco – Assistant Secretary-General for Peacebuilding Support
 Bintou Keita – Assistant Secretary-General for Africa, DRC lead
 Miroslav Jenča – Assistant Secretary-General for Europe, Central Asia and Americas
 Mohamed Khaled Khiari – Assistant Secretary-General for Middle East, Asia and the Pacific

On 28 March 2018, UN Secretary-General António Guterres announced the appointment of Rosemary DiCarlo of the United States, President of the National Committee on American Foreign Policy and Senior Fellow at the Jackson Institute for Global Affairs, Yale University, as Under-Secretary-General for Political Affairs. Ms. DiCarlo succeeded Jeffrey D. Feltman of the United States, who completed his assignment on 31 March 2018.

Former Under-Secretaries-General
This table lists the former Under-Secretaries-General (USGs) who served:

 under the Department of Political and Security Council Affairs (1952–1992)
 under the Department of Political Affairs (1992–2019)
 under the Department of Political and Peacebuilding Affairs (2019–)

Field missions
As of December 2016, the DPA manages the following political missions and peace-building support offices engaged in conflict prevention, peacemaking and post-conflict peacebuilding in Africa, Central Asia and the Middle East:

In Africa:
UNIOGBIS, United Nations Integrated Peace-building Support Office in Guinea-Bissau
UNOCA, United Nations Office for Central Africa
UNOWAS, United Nations Office for West Africa and the Sahel
UNSMIL, United Nations Support Mission in Libya
UNSOM, United Nations Assistance Mission in Somalia 
In Asia:
UNAMA, United Nations Assistance Mission in Afghanistan
UNRCCA, United Nations Regional Centre for Preventive Diplomacy in Central Asia
In the Middle East:
UNAMI, United Nations Assistance Mission for Iraq
UNSCO, Office of the United Nations Special Coordinator for the Middle East Peace Process
UNSCOL, Office of the United Nations Special Coordinator for Lebanon
In South America:
 The United Nations Mission in Colombia
These DPA-led field operations are headed by senior representatives of the Secretary-General and provide a forward platform for preventive diplomacy and other activities across a range of disciplines, to help prevent and resolve conflict or to build lasting peace in nations emerging from civil wars. The peace-building offices, currently active in Burundi, Guinea-Bissau, the Central African Republic and Sierra Leone aim to help nations consolidate peace through comprehensive peace-building strategies developed and carried out in coordination with national actors and U.N. development and humanitarian entities on the ground.
Political missions are part of a continuum of UN peace operations working in different stages of the conflict cycle. In some instances, following the signing of peace agreements, political missions overseen by the Department of Political Affairs during the stage of peace negotiations have been replaced by peacekeeping missions. In other instances, U.N. peacekeeping operations have given way to special political missions overseeing longer-term peace-building activities.

Good Offices missions

In addition to the field-based missions currently under its supervision, DPA provides guidance and support to traveling envoys and special advisers of the Secretary-General bringing to bear his “good offices” for the resolution of conflicts or the implementation of other UN mandates. These currently include UN envoys or special advisers for Cyprus, Yemen, Syria, Western Sahara, and the Macedonian-Greek naming dispute.

Investigative Mandates and Fact-Finding Missions

DPA has also assisted in establishing and providing support to various UN investigative and fact-finding bodies. These have included: the International Commission Against Impunity in Guatemala (CICIG); the United Nations Commission of Inquiry into the assassination of Benazir Bhutto, the former Prime Minister of Pakistan; the International Commission of Inquiry on the 28 September 2009 events in Guinea; and the United Nations International Investigation Commission in the assassination of former Lebanese Prime Minister Rafik Hariri.

See also

United Nations Department of Peacekeeping Operations
United Nations Secretariat

Notes

External links
Records of the United Nations Department of Political Affairs (1992-present) at the United Nations Archives
Records of the United Nations Office for Special Political Affairs (1955-1991) at the United Nations Archives
E-Newsletter of the United Nations Department of Political Affairs
Print Newsletter of the United Nations Department of Political Affairs
UN Department of Political Affairs
Map: UN Political and Peacebuilding Missions
UN Department of Political Affairs: Senior Officials
UN Peacemaker website for peacemaking professionals

United Nations organizations based in North America
United Nations Secretariat
United Nations Development Group